aka Attack!! is a 1978 Japanese film in the "violent pink" style of Nikkatsu's Roman porno series, directed by Yasuharu Hasebe and starring Asami Ogawa and Yōko Azusa.

Synopsis
A policewoman is attacked, handcuffed and raped while on night patrol. Rather than report the incident, she determines to find and punish the rapist herself. After the same attacker again rapes her in the police restroom, she becomes terrified of another encounter, and develops a victim mentality. The criminal is neither caught nor identified at the end of the film, leaving the policewoman's feelings of terror and desire for vengeance unresolved.

Cast
 Asami Ogawa as Kumiko Kawai
 Yōko Azusa as  Eiko Yano
 Shigeru Ichiki as Tamura
 Kai Abe as Ōkubo
 Atsushi Takahashi as Ejima 
 Kunio Shimizu as Shingo Kanai
 Yuri Risa as Mayumi
 Noboru Migaki as Male gangster A
 Toshikatsu Matsukaze as Male gangster B
 Tomoko Sakurai as Female gangster A
 Fumie Akira as Fembale gangster B
 Jun Todoki as Yasugi's wife

Critical appraisal
The film's ending, in which the attacker's identity remains a mystery, has generated the most polarizing comment from critics. Some consider this a suspenseful, unusual plot strategy, while others dismiss it as teasing the audience. In their Japanese Cinema Encyclopedia: The Sex Films, the Weissers write, "the unsettling nature of this denouement generates considerably more tension than the standard thriller, as the viewer can't shake the feeling that the story hasn't ended at all. The fear continues long after the credits insist it's The End".

The Weissers judge Attacked!! to be a step back in the brutality Hasebe portrayed in his "offensively appalling" Rape! 13th Hour (1977), writing, "The film is still deplorable, but not nearly as repulsive as the former notorious entry". Allmovie also notes that this film is less extreme than Rape! 13th Hour, but that Hasebe nevertheless creates tension through the suspenseful plot. Of the attacker never being revealed, Allmovie comments, "The ending feels a bit like a cheat to those viewers attempting to guess the rapist's identity, but the film holds together as a solid thriller nonetheless".

Availability
Attacked!! was released theatrically in Japan on February 4, 1978. It was released on DVD in Japan on March 24, 2006, as part of Geneon's third wave of Nikkatsu Roman porno series.

Bibliography

English

Japanese

Notes

1978 films
1970s erotic thriller films
Films directed by Yasuharu Hasebe
1970s Japanese-language films
Nikkatsu films
Pink films
1970s pornographic films
Japanese erotic thriller films
1970s Japanese films